St Augustine's Abbey is a UNESCO World Heritage Site in Canterbury.

St Augustine's Abbey may also refer to:

 St Augustine's Abbey, Bristol
 St Augustine's Abbey, Chilworth
 St Augustine's Abbey, Ramsgate

See also
 St. Augustine's Church (disambiguation)
 St. Augustine Catholic Church (disambiguation)
 St. Augustine Catholic Church and Cemetery (disambiguation)
 Cathedral of Saint Augustine (disambiguation)
 St. Augustine's College (disambiguation)